The women's pole vault event at the 1999 European Athletics U23 Championships was held in Göteborg, Sweden, at Ullevi on 29 and 31 July 1999.

Medalists

Results

Final
31 July

Qualifications
29 July
First 12 the Final

Participation
According to an unofficial count, 17 athletes from 11 countries participated in the event.

 (1)
 (1)
 (2)
 (3)
 (1)
 (1)
 (1)
 (1)
 (2)
 (1)
 (3)

References

Pole vault
Pole vault at the European Athletics U23 Championships